Brent Fraser "Billy" Bowden (born 11 April 1963) was 
a cricket umpire from New Zealand. He was a player until he began to suffer from rheumatoid arthritis. He is well known for his dramatic signaling style which includes the famous "crooked finger of doom" out signal. On 6 February 2016, Bowden stood in his 200th One Day International match in the game between New Zealand and Australia in Wellington.

Early life and career 
In March 1995, he officiated his first One Day International between New Zealand and Sri Lanka at Hamilton. In March 2000 he was appointed his first Test match as an on-field umpire, and in 2002 he was included in the Emirates Panel of International Umpires. A year later he was asked to umpire at the Cricket World Cup in South Africa, and was chosen to be the fourth umpire in the final between Australia and India. Shortly after this he was duly promoted to the Emirates Elite Panel of ICC Umpires, of which he was a member until 2013. He reprised his role as fourth umpire in the 2007 Cricket World Cup final Bowden was involved in an incident at the 2006 Brisbane Ashes test while standing at the square leg fielding position, when knocked to the ground by a ball hit by Geraint Jones.

He was selected as one of the twenty umpires to stand in matches during the 2015 Cricket World Cup.

He was a member of the International Panel of Umpires and Referees until June 2016, when he was demoted to New Zealand's national panel.

On 24 December 2020, he umpired the Dream 11 domestic T20 competition opening double-header between Wellington Firebirds and Auckland Aces as both men's and women's sides were both featured.  January 2023, he is currently umpiring in the Super Smash T20 women's competition.

Rheumatoid arthritis and umpiring style 
Suffering from rheumatoid arthritis, it was too painful for Bowden to signal a batsman out in the conventional fashion, with a straight index finger raised above the head, and this led to the "crooked finger of doom". He has also put his own slant on several other signals, including a "crumb-sweeping" wave of the arm to signal four, and the "double crooked finger six-phase hop" to signal a six. His signals are sedate in Tests, more flashy in ODIs and decidedly flamboyant in Twenty20. His behaviour has attracted him both fans and critics almost equally. Martin Crowe referred to him as Bozo the Clown, and at least one commentator has said he should remember that cricket is for the players and fans, not for the umpires. However, there was a suggestion that he needs to do the signals in the way he does because of his arthritis, as he needs to keep his body fluid.

See also
 List of Test cricket umpires
 List of One Day International cricket umpires
 List of Twenty20 International cricket umpires

References

External links 
 Billy Bowden at Cricinfo.

1963 births
Living people
New Zealand cricketers
New Zealand Test cricket umpires
New Zealand One Day International cricket umpires
New Zealand Twenty20 International cricket umpires
People educated at Westlake Boys High School